Lisa Marshall (born 12 September 1987) is a South African former professional tennis player.

Marshall, a native of Cape Town, made her only WTA Tour main draw appearance at the 2007 Internationaux de Strasbourg, partnering Germany's Janine Tiszolczy in the doubles.

ITF finals

Doubles: 5 (1–4)

References

External links
 
 

1987 births
Living people
South African female tennis players
Sportspeople from Cape Town